Grevillea albiflora, commonly known as white spider flower, is a species of flowering plant in the family Proteaceae and is endemic to inland eastern Australia. It is a shrub or small tree with pinnatisect leaves with linear lobes, and white to creamy-green flowers.

Description

Taxonomy
Grevillea albiflora was first formally described in 1944 by Cyril Tenison White in Proceedings of the Royal Society of Queensland from specimens collected near Cunnamulla in 1939 by Stanley Thatcher Blake. The specific epithet (albiflora) means "white-flowered".

Distribution and habitat
White spider flower grows in deep red sand in two disjunct populations, one from near Uluru to Rainbow Valley in the southern Northern Territory and northern South Australia, and the other from near Cunnamulla and St George in Queensland to Bourke in New South Wales.

References

albiflora
Proteales of Australia
Flora of New South Wales
Flora of Queensland
Flora of South Australia
Flora of the Northern Territory
Plants described in 1944
Taxa named by Cyril Tenison White